Senator Archibald may refer to:

Frank C. Archibald (Vermont politician) (1857–1935), Vermont State Senate
Julius A. Archibald (1901–1979), New York State Senate